Wendel L. Clark (born October 25, 1966) is a Canadian former professional ice hockey player. His professional career lasted from 1985 until 2000, during which time he played for the Toronto Maple Leafs, Quebec Nordiques, New York Islanders, Tampa Bay Lightning, Detroit Red Wings and Chicago Blackhawks. He was chosen first overall in the 1985 NHL Entry Draft by the Maple Leafs, the team he played with on three occasions, captaining the team from 1991 to 1994. Clark is a fan favourite in Toronto, continuing to represent the Maple Leafs at public events.

Playing career

Junior
A star junior hockey defenceman with the Saskatoon Blades of the Western Hockey League, Clark was a member of Canada's gold medal-winning team at the 1985 World Junior Ice Hockey Championships.

Toronto Maple Leafs (1985–1994)
Clark was converted to forward after he was selected first overall by the Toronto Maple Leafs in the 1985 NHL Entry Draft. Clark was known for his physical play and his offensive mind combined with scoring prowess. As tough as Clark was, his scoring touch and offensive ability was equal to his on-ice toughness. Clark's 227 PIM in his rookie season was the 1985–86 Toronto Maple Leafs team-high, along with 34 goals which also led the team. After his rookie season, he was named to the NHL All-Rookie Team and finished third in voting for the Calder Memorial Trophy.

The serious back injury that Clark suffered during a game against the Chicago Blackhawks in 1987 when he was cross-checked into the crossbar of his own goal, hindered his progress as an elite NHL player. Nonetheless, he was a crowd favourite at Maple Leaf Gardens and won a place in the hearts of Leaf fans as he provided a spark during the latter part of the Harold Ballard era, considered the darkest period in the storied franchise's history.

Clark was named captain of the team for the 1991–92 season. During the 1992–93 season, Clark's second year captaining the team, the Leafs set team records in wins (44) and points (99) and also made the playoffs for the first time in three years. The Leafs had a memorable run to the Campbell Conference Finals, but after leading the best-of-seven series three games to two coming within one game of advancing to the Stanley Cup Finals, they lost to the Wayne Gretzky-led Los Angeles Kings, who were coached by Clark's cousin, Barry Melrose. 

Two career-defining moments happened in this series for Clark: his toe-to-toe fight in Game 1 of the series with enforcer Marty McSorley in retribution for a big hit McSorley made on Leafs star Doug Gilmour, and his hat-trick in Game Six of the seven-game series. "That series was probably the most excitement I saw around here," proclaimed Clark, who had a legendary series performance with 20 points (10 goals and 10 assists) in his 21 games during the '93 playoffs. "It was the furthest the Leafs had advanced in a long time, the team was coming together at the right time and everybody was doing their jobs."

Clark managed a career-high 46 goals in 64 games for the Leafs during the 1993–94 season, playing on a line with Dave Andreychuk and Doug Gilmour. In the playoffs, the Leafs made a second consecutive trip to the Conference Finals but fell 4–1 to the Vancouver Canucks, who were coached by future Leafs coach Pat Quinn.

Trades, return to Toronto and later years (1994–2000)
In June 1994, with his value at an all-time high, Clark was traded to the Quebec Nordiques in a multi-player deal that notably involved a young Mats Sundin. He was succeeded as Maple Leafs captain by Gilmour. Clark played the lockout-shortened 1994–95 NHL season in Quebec.

After the Nordiques became the Colorado Avalanche, Clark became embroiled in a contract dispute with the team. As a result, shortly before the beginning of the 1995–96 campaign, he was sent to the New York Islanders in a three-way trade that brought Claude Lemieux to Colorado and Steve Thomas to the New Jersey Devils. Clark played 58 games with the Islanders but finished the season back in Toronto.

The Islanders received a first-round pick from the Leafs (4th overall in 1997) which turned out to be Roberto Luongo.

In 1998 Clark signed as a free agent with the Tampa Bay Lightning, where he earned a spot on the North American All-Star team and went on to score 28 goals in 65 games.  Despite his success in Tampa Bay, he was dealt at the trade deadline to the Detroit Red Wings, where he finished the 1998–99 season. Clark signed with the Chicago Blackhawks later in 1999 but only appeared in 13 games with the team.

Upon returning to the Leafs in 2000, after being benched by the Blackhawks, Clark was not particularly effective for the remainder of the regular season, but he found his form for the Leafs' playoff run. Leaf fans gave their former captain a 90-second standing ovation after Clark barreled into the New Jersey Devils zone and hit the post in Game 1. During Game 4, Clark assisted on the game-winning goal that gave the Leafs a 2–1 victory and tied the series with the Devils.

Post-retirement
Clark is now employed by the Toronto Maple Leafs Hockey Club as a community ambassador and public relations. He can be seen at virtually all Leaf home games, usually with his wife Denise and children. The Toronto Maple Leafs honoured the former captain by raising his legendary number 17 to the rafters on November 22, 2008, at the Air Canada Centre.  The number was officially retired by the team on October 15, 2016, during a home pre-game ceremony in which 17 players representing 11 sweater numbers were similarly honoured. Prior to the Leafs' Hockey Day in Canada game against the Ottawa Senators on Saturday, February 18, 2017, it was announced that statues of iconic Leafs Charlie Conacher, Red Kelly, Frank Mahovlich and Wendel would be added to the Leafs' Legends Row, located outside the Air Canada Centre, as part of the ongoing Maple Leafs' Centennial Anniversary.

He owns Wendel Clark's Classic Grill and Sports Lounge, with four restaurants in Saskatoon, Saskatchewan; Brampton, Ontario; Oshawa, Ontario; and Burlington, Ontario. He resides in King City.

Personal life

Family 
Clark's first cousin is ex-NHLer and ESPN commentator Barry Melrose; he is also a cousin of former Detroit Red Wing and Saskatoon Blade Joe Kocur. Clark's younger brother Kerry Clark was also a professional hockey player; he was a career minor leaguer who is in the top 60 in minor league history in penalty minutes with 2812. Clark's other brother, Donn Clark, is best known for being the head coach of the Prince Albert Raiders and the Saskatoon Blades.

Clark's son, Kody, played three seasons for the Ottawa 67's of the Ontario Hockey League beginning in 2016.  Kody was selected 47th overall in  the 2018 NHL Entry Draft by the Washington Capitals, and currently plays for the Hershey Bears.

In popular culture
Though it was released very early in his career, arguably before he became well known as a player, Clark was celebrated by the Canadian band The Rheostatics in the song "The Ballad of Wendel Clark Parts I & II" on their debut album, Greatest Hits.

Awards
 WHL East First All-Star Team – 1985
 Selected to two NHL All-Star Games: 1986 and 1999
 NHL All-Rookie Team – 1986
 Inducted into the Ontario Sports Hall of Fame in 2011.
 #17 jersey retired by the Toronto Maple Leafs.

Career statistics

Regular season and playoffs

International

See also
Captain (ice hockey)
Notable families in the NHL

References

External links

Official website

1966 births
Athol Murray College of Notre Dame alumni
Canadian ice hockey left wingers
Chicago Blackhawks players
Detroit Red Wings players
Ice hockey people from Saskatchewan
Living people
National Hockey League All-Stars
National Hockey League first-overall draft picks
National Hockey League first-round draft picks
New York Islanders players
People from Kelvington, Saskatchewan
Quebec Nordiques players
Saskatoon Blades players
Tampa Bay Lightning players
Toronto Maple Leafs draft picks
Toronto Maple Leafs players